RLP may refer to:

Medicine and chemistry 
 2,3-diketo-5-methylthiopentyl-1-phosphate enolase, an enzyme
 Regional limb perfusion, a method of medication delivery in animals.
 Round Ligament Pain, a pain of the round ligament of uterus

Computing 
 Radio Link Protocol, an automatic repeat request fragmentation protocol used over a wireless (typically cellular) air interface
 RLP (complexity), the complexity class of problems solvable by a probabilistic machine in logarithmic space and polynomial time with one-sided error
 Recursive Length Prefix, a binary data serialization format used by the Ethereum blockchain

Other uses
 Rashtriya Loktantrik Party, an independent political party in India.
 Reel Life Productions, an independent record label founded by rapper Esham
 Rhineland-Palatinate, a federal state of the Federal Republic of Germany
 Riverside Long Playing, serial number for Riverside Records LP albums
 Rohingya Liberation Party, Rakhine State, Myanmar